I Want to Live! is a 1958 American biographical film noir directed by Robert Wise and starring Susan Hayward, Simon Oakland, Virginia Vincent and Theodore Bikel. It follows the life of Barbara Graham, a prostitute and habitual criminal who is convicted of murder and faces capital punishment. The screenplay, written by Nelson Gidding and Don Mankiewicz, was adapted from personal letters written by Graham in addition to newspaper articles written by Pulitzer Prize-winning journalist Ed Montgomery. The film presents a highly fictionalized version of the case, indicating the possibility that Graham may have been innocent.

Released in late 1958, I Want to Live! was a commercial and critical success, garnering favorable reviews from critics for Hayward's performance as well as the film's realistic depiction of capital punishment. The film earned a total of six Academy Award nominations, with Hayward winning a Best Actress Oscar at the 31st Academy Awards as well as the Golden Globe Award in the same category.

Plot
In 1950 San Francisco, petty criminal and prostitute Barbara Graham faces a misdemeanor charge for soliciting sex. She returns to her native San Diego, but is soon charged with perjury after she provides two criminal friends a false alibi. She subsequently returns to prostitution and other criminal activities to make a living and begins working for thief Emmett Perkins by luring men to his gambling parlor. Barbara manages to earn a significant amount of money, and quits working for Emmett to marry Hank, her third husband. The couple have a son, Bobby, but their marriage is in turmoil because of Hank's gambling addiction and physical abuse.

Barbara forces Hank to leave, but she is soon evicted from her apartment. Desperate, she leaves Bobby in the care of her mother and returns to working for Emmett, who is now associated with thugs John Santo and Bruce King. Police crack down on the operation and Barbara surrenders. During the interrogation, she is stunned when authorities accuse her of helping Perkins and Santo murder Mabel Monahan, an elderly Burbank woman. Barbara insists that she was home with her husband and son on the night of the murder but is indicted by a grand jury. Barbara's childhood friend Peg visits her in jail and agrees to help care for Bobby.

Attorney Richard Tibrow is assigned to Barbara's case and informs her that her alibi is meaningless unless Hank can corroborate it. Barbara furtively concocts a phony alibi with Ben Miranda, supposedly a friend of a fellow prisoner. At the trial, it is revealed that Ben is a police officer who recorded her confession with a hidden microphone during their meeting. Barbara insists that she sought the false alibi only to avoid the death penalty, and that her admission is false. She is ultimately convicted, along with Emmett and John, and all three are sentenced to death.

Tibrow withdraws from Barbara's case and is replaced by Al Matthews. In prison, Barbara is relentlessly defiant, refusing to wear her uniform and demanding a radio. Matthews has psychologist Carl Palmberg evaluate Barbara, hoping to ultimately administer a lie detection test. After visiting with her, Carl states that while Barbara appears to be amoral, she is averse to violence. He also observes that she is left-handed, and the murder was committed by a right-handed person. Journalist Edward Montgomery, who has covered Barbara's case all along, questions her conviction and publishes a sympathetic series of articles describing her troubled life. As her execution date draws near, Barbara grows increasingly anxious. A Supreme Court stay gives her hope that her sentence may be commuted, but it is overturned when Carl dies unexpectedly of heart disease. Al's petition for a retrial is denied, and Barbara's execution date is set.

The day before her execution, a demoralized Barbara is transferred to San Quentin Prison, where she meets with a priest. That evening, she is angered to hear that multiple couples are seeking to adopt her son. She stays awake all night, wistfully recounting her marriage with Hank to a prison nurse. In the morning, 45 minutes before Barbara's scheduled execution, California governor Goodwin J. Knight declares a stay, but Al's writ is invalidated and the execution is ordered to proceed. Barbara is taken to the gas chamber, but the execution is again halted when Al's amended writ is declared.

The uncertainty and desperation surrounding her fate reduces Barbara to hysterics. She is returned to her cell, where she and the prison staff wait several minutes for a response to Al's writ. They are informed that it has again been rejected and that Barbara's execution is to proceed immediately. Before entering the gas chamber, Barbara demands a mask, as she does not want to see the faces of the witnesses to what she regards as her murder. She is strapped to the chair and executed with cyanide gas. After Barbara is pronounced dead, a despondent Edward leaves the prison. On his way out, he is met by Al, who gives him a note from Barbara thanking him for his efforts to help her.

Cast

 Susan Hayward as Barbara Graham
 Simon Oakland as Edward S. "Ed" Montgomery
 Virginia Vincent as Peg
 Theodore Bikel as Carl G.G. Palmberg
 Wesley Lau as Henry L. Graham
 Philip Coolidge as Emmett Perkins
 Lou Krugman as John R. "Jack" Santo
 James Philbrook as Bruce King
 Bartlett Robinson as District Attorney Milton
 Marion Marshall as Rita (uncredited)
 Gage Clarke as Attorney Richard G. Tibrow (credited surname as "Clark")
 Joe De Santis as Al Matthews
 John Marley as Father Devers
 Raymond Bailey as San Quentin Warden
 Gertrude Flynn as San Quentin Matron
 Russell Thorson as San Quentin Sergeant
 Dabbs Greer as the San Quentin Captain
 Stafford Repp as the police Sergeant
 Gavin MacLeod as the police Lieutenant
 Alice Backes as Barbara the San Quentin Nurse
 Wendell Holmes as the police detective
 George Putnam as himself
 Peter Breck as Ben Miranda (uncredited)

Accuracy
According to historian Kathleen Cairns, I Want to Live! "implied that Graham's guilt or innocence was largely irrelevant, that the real crime was committed by a justice system that framed her and a media that abetted the effort... In reality, the film took liberty with many facts of the case." The film also suggests that Graham, though believed to have sociopathic tendencies in real life, was dangerous only to herself as a result of her loveless childhood and abusive mother.

A prologue and epilogue contributed to the film by Edward Montgomery, the journalist who covered Graham's case, characterize the film's content, which largely portrays Graham as innocent of the murder, as factual. However, there may have been substantial evidence of Graham's complicity in the crime, including her taped confession to an undercover officer. In an interview with Robert Osborne, Susan Hayward admitted that her research on the evidence and letters in the case led her to believe that Graham was guilty.

Despite some of the liberties taken with Graham's story, the film's depiction of the California gas chamber was regarded as accurate.

Production

Development
The film's screenplay was originally written by Don Mankiewicz based on letters by convicted murderer Barbara Graham, who was executed in 1955, and a series of articles by journalist Edward S. Montgomery. In early 1958, after a draft of the screenplay was completed, Nelson Gidding was commissioned to write a redraft and tighten the narrative as it "lacked focus" and contained too many pages concentrating on Graham's troubled childhood. Gidding's redraft omitted any depiction of the murder of Mable Monohan as well as Graham's months spent at San Quentin State Prison during her appeals.

Casting
When questioned about taking the controversial role, Susan Hayward said: "I just had to play her. If I hadn't thought they should make [the film], I wouldn't have played the part."

Filming
Principal photography began in April 1958.

To ensure that the execution sequence was depicted as accurately as possible, Wise attended a public execution at San Quentin. Hayward commented after completing filming that her simulated experience of execution convinced her that the practice was "medieval."

Musical score

In addition to Mandel's score, the film features jazz themes performed by Gerry Mulligan's combo. Two soundtrack albums were released by United Artists Records in 1958.

Release

Box office
Although some sources state that the film grossed $3.5 million, the Walter Wanger biography Walter Wanger, Hollywood Independent indicated that the film grossed $5,641,711, with a net profit of $2,455,570. Hayward was entitled to 37% of the film's overall profit.

Critical response

Upon release, I Want to Live! was met with a largely favorable critical response, with many critics heralding the film as an "indictment against capital punishment," citing its clinical, harrowing depiction of execution. Producer Walter Wanger received numerous congratulatory letters praising the film after its release, including those from writers Arthur Miller, Paddy Chayefsky, Leon Uris and Albert Camus, all of whom were ardent opponents of capital punishment.

Variety magazine published a favorable review: "There is no attempt to gloss the character of Barbara Graham, only an effort to understand it through some fine irony and pathos. She had no hesitation about indulging in any form of crime or vice that promised excitement on her own, rather mean, terms ... Hayward brings off this complex characterization. Simon Oakland, as Montgomery, who first crucified Barbara Graham in print and then attempted to undo what he had done, underplays his role with assurance."

Film critic Bosley Crowther of The New York Times wrote: "Miss Hayward plays it superbly, under the consistently sharp direction of Robert Wise, who has shown here a stunning mastery of the staccato realistic style. From a loose and wise-cracking B-girl she moves onto levels of cold disdain and then plunges down to depths of terror and bleak surrender as she reaches the end. Except that the role does not present us a precisely pretty character, its performance merits for Miss Hayward the most respectful applause."

Gene Blake, the reporter who covered the actual murder trial for the Los Angeles Daily Mirror, called the film "a dramatic and eloquent piece of propaganda for the abolition of the death penalty."

By March 1959, Billboard noted that the popularity of the film and of Mandel's and Mulligan's albums "prompted a rush of jazz film scores" and cited as examples Duke Ellington's score for Anatomy of a Murder, the release of The Five Pennies (a biopic about the jazz band leader Red Nichols) and the 1960 documentary Jazz on a Summer's Day.

In a 1993 reappraisal, film critic Danny Peary wrote that Hayward is "...the actress of that era [the 1940s and '50s] who most needs rediscovery, and the best film to start with is I Want to Live!."

The review aggregator Rotten Tomatoes reports a 94% approval rating based on 16 reviews, with an average rating of 7.9/10.

Awards and honors

Home media
MGM Home Entertainment released I Want to Live! on DVD on May 7, 2002. Kino Lorber reissued the film on DVD featuring a restored print in October 2015. In November 2016, Twilight Time released the film on Blu-ray disc in a limited edition of 3,000 units.

Adaptation
I Want to Live! was remade for television in 1983. The television film features Lindsay Wagner, Martin Balsam, Pamela Reed, Harry Dean Stanton, Dana Elcar, Ellen Geer, Robert Ginty and Barry Primus.

References

Sources

External links
 
 
 
 
 

1958 films
Film noir
1958 crime drama films
1950s legal films
1950s prison films
American biographical drama films
American black-and-white films
American courtroom films
American crime drama films
Crime films based on actual events
1950s English-language films
Films scored by Johnny Mandel
Films about capital punishment
Films directed by Robert Wise
Films featuring a Best Actress Academy Award-winning performance
Films featuring a Best Drama Actress Golden Globe-winning performance
Films produced by Walter Wanger
Films set in Los Angeles
Films set in San Francisco
Films shot in California
United Artists films
Biographical films about criminals
Films based on newspaper and magazine articles
1950s American films